Adam's Green is a hamlet near the village of Halstock in Dorset, England.

External links

Villages in Dorset